Oh Eui-shik (오의식, born November 1, 1983) is a South Korean actor. Oh made his musical debut in 2006 and has since built up his acting skills in a number of plays and television drama. He is known for roles in television dramas such as Oh My Ghost, Love in the Moonlight, Hi Bye, Mama!, Wok of Love, and True Beauty.

Career 
Oh Eui-sik was born November 1, 1983 in Jeju and lived there until his early twenties. He moved to Seoul and worked as an office worker in the design interior field. His office was located in popular Daehakro (comparable to Off-Broadway). Oh's natural immersion in the theatre world began after he watched a lot of stage performances. Whilst watching actors performed onstage, he realised he too wanted to act. What he said about his decision to be an actor, "At that time, I was just waiting for my time to get off work and felt bored with my work life. I thought that if I became an actor, I wouldn’t have to wait for work hours."

Oh made his stage debut in 2006, appeared in children's musical Bremen Musician. However his first project as professional actor was in open run musical Five Sketches of Love in 2007. He remained a frequent performer of the open run for two years.

In 2009, Oh joined the musical Rocksitter. This work is an adaptation of Fishing Field War by playwright Lee Geun-sam. The story is about a bank clerk in his mid-30s in his household uniform who meets by chance at a fishing spot and Oh Beom-ha, a restaurant owner in his 60s, quarreling and coming to understand each other. Oh and actress Lee Bong-ryun acted in multiple characters. They acted as collectors, coffee shops, adulterous couples, elderly couples, and rescue workers.

In 2013, Oh officially became member of the theater company Ganda. Play Me and Grandpa, written by Min Jun-ho was his first Theater Ganda project.

In 2014, Oh played bar owner in the play Shall we go to karaoke and talk? As the title suggests, the work depicts various episodes unfolding in a 'karaoke room'. This performance was the 4th works of the 10th anniversary parade of the theater company Ganda.

He was discovered onstage by director Yoo Je-won who offered him to audition for role in his television drama. He co-starred as kitchen assistant Choi Ji-woong in tvN fantasy drama series Oh My Ghost (2015), starring Jo Jung-suk, Park Bo-young, Kim Seul-gi and Kwak Si-yang.

In 2021, Oh did special appearance in tvN drama series Hometown Cha-Cha-Cha as Park Jung-woo, Hong Du-sik's friend whom he met during college days.

In June, 2022, Oh signed exclusive contract with History D&C Agency.

Filmography

Film

Television series

Stage

Musical

Theater

References

External links 
 
 
 
 Oh Eui-sik at Daum Encyclopedia 
 Oh Eui-sik at Daum Movie 
 Oh Eui-sik at PlayDB 
 Oh Eui-sik at Naver 

1983 births
Living people
People from Jeju Province
21st-century South Korean male actors
South Korean male film actors
South Korean male models
South Korean male television actors